Ieuan Jones (born 22 July 1993) is a Welsh rugby union player. A back row forward he played for Newport Gwent Dragons before joining Cardiff Blues at the end of the 2013–14 season.

International
In April 2012 he was named in the Wales Under-20 squad for the Junior World Cup in South Africa.

In January 2013 he was selected in the Wales Under 20 squad for the 2013 Under 20 Six Nations Championship.

References

External links 
 Newport Gwent Dragons profile

1993 births
Living people
Cardiff Rugby players
Dragons RFC players
Rugby union players from Blackwood, Caerphilly
Welsh rugby union players
Ospreys (rugby union) players